Poems and Problems is a book by Vladimir Nabokov published in 1969. It consists of 39 poems originally written in Russian and translated by Nabokov, 14 poems written in English, and 18 chess problems.

One of the 39 poems originally written in Russian, "Lilith," in 1928, can be looked at as a foreshadowing of his 1955 novel Lolita. However, in the author's notes, Nabokov states that "Intelligent readers will abstain from examining this impersonal fantasy for any links with my later fiction," and that the poem was written "...to amuse a friend."

Table of contents 
 THIRTY-NINE RUSSIAN POEMS

 FOURTEEN ENGLISH POEMS

Quote
 "Chess problems demand from the composer the same virtues that characterize all worthwhile art: originality, invention, conciseness, harmony, complexity, and splendid insincerity."

External links
 "Nabokov Under Glass" (New York Public Library)
 18 chess problems from Poems and Problems

Poetry by Vladimir Nabokov
1969 poems
Chess books
Chess problems